Andreasyan is an Armenian surname derived from the given name Andreas, equivalent to English Anderson. Notable people with the surname include:

 Arkady Andreasyan (1947 - 2020), Soviet-Armenian football player
 Karen Andreasyan (born 1977), Armenian lawyer and minister
 Sarik Andreasyan (born 1984), Russian-Armenian film director

Armenian-language surnames
Patronymic surnames
Surnames from given names